The Wheeler–Kenyon method is a method of archaeological excavation.  The technique originates from the work of Mortimer Wheeler and Tessa Wheeler at Verulamium (1930–35), and was later refined by Kathleen Kenyon during her excavations at Jericho (1952–58). The Wheeler–Kenyon system involves digging within a series of squares that can vary in size set within a larger grid. This leaves a freestanding wall of earth—known as a "balk"—that can range from 50 cm for temporary grids, and measure up to 2 metres in width for a deeper square. The normal width of a permanent balk is 1 metre on each side of a unit.  These vertical slices of earth allow archaeologists to compare the exact provenance of a found object or feature to adjacent layers of earth ("strata"). During Kenyon's excavations at Jericho, this technique helped discern the long and complicated occupational history of the site. It was believed that this approach allowed more precise stratigraphic observations than earlier "horizontal exposure" techniques that relied on architectural and ceramic analysis.

References

Sources 

jstor.org
online.vkrp.org

Archaeological theory
Methods in archaeology